In chemistry, a pentazolate is a compound that contains a cyclo-N5− ion, the anion of pentazole. In 2017, researchers prepared the first salt (N5)6(H3O)3(NH4)4Cl containing pentazolate anion starting a substituted phenylpentazole, m-CPBA and iron(II) glycinate. A series of metal and nonmetal pentazolates were subsequently synthesized according to their work.

List of pentazolates

References

See also
 Azide (N3−)
 Diazenide (N22−)
 Nitride (N3−)

Nitrogen compounds